Patrick James "Paddy" Burns (10 March 1881 – 24 February 1943) was a New Zealand rugby union player. A halfback and three-quarter, Burns represented  at a provincial level from 1904 to 1913, and was a member of the New Zealand national side, the All Blacks, between 1908 and 1913. He played nine matches for the All Blacks including five internationals.

References

1881 births
1943 deaths
New Zealand rugby union players
New Zealand international rugby union players
Canterbury rugby union players
Rugby union scrum-halves
Rugby union centres
Rugby union wings
Rugby union players from Canterbury, New Zealand